The chief financial officer of Florida is an elected statewide constitutional officer of Florida. The office was created in 2002 following the 1998 reforms of the Florida Cabinet. The CFO is a combination of the former offices of comptroller and treasurer/insurance commissioner/fire marshal. The office heads the Florida Department of Financial Services and is responsible for overseeing the state's finances, collecting revenue, paying state bills, auditing state agencies, regulating cemeteries and funerals, and handling fires and arsons. In addition, the CFO has administrative oversight over the offices which handles banking and insurance regulation. The CFO is a member of the Cabinet is third (behind the lieutenant governor and attorney general, respectively) in the line of succession to the office of Governor of Florida.

History
Tom Gallagher was the first state CFO and a former treasurer/insurance commissioner/fire marshal.  Gallagher retired from the position in 2006 and Alex Sink (D), a Florida business executive and the wife of former Florida gubernatorial candidate Bill McBride, was elected on November 7, 2006. Alex Sink launched an unsuccessful campaign for governor in 2010, and was succeeded by Jeff Atwater. Atwater resigned and then-governor Rick Scott appointed Jimmy Patronis to the post. Patronis won a statewide election and retained the post in 2018.

List of chief financial officers

See also
Constitution of Florida
Florida Cabinet
Florida chief financial officer election, 2006
Florida chief financial officer election, 2010
Florida chief financial officer election, 2014
Florida Democratic Party
Republican Party of Florida

References

External links
Florida Department of Financial Services

 
2002 establishments in Florida